Saint-Auban-sur-l'Ouvèze (literally Saint Auban on the Ouvèze) is a commune in the Drôme department in southeastern France.

Population

See also
Communes of the Drôme department

References

Communes of Drôme